Syfy is the French-speaking 24-hour science fiction entertainment channel based on the US version of the same name. The channel originally launched in December 2005 under the branding of the Sci-fi Channel. It became the fourth "Sci Fi Channel" alongside channels in the United States, UK and Germany. The channel was rebranded Syfy on January 5, 2010 as part of global rebrand. Some years later, it was changed for SYFY on August 29, 2017 as part of another global rebrand.

2010 Rebrand
Sci-fi was rebranded as Syfy since January 5 2010 (formerly known as Sci Fi in France).
The channel rebranding coincides with NBC Universal Global Networks rebranding campaign which initially started in the US in July 1999.

Ownership
Syfy is one of two channels operating in France under ownership of General Electric's NBC Universal Global Networks network. French company Vivendi hold a 20 per cent share in NBC Universal. NBC Universal Global Networks also operate two other channels in France called 13ème Rue (http://www.13èmerue.fr) and E!.

Distribution
France: Syfy (SD) and Syfy (HD) are widely available in France on CanalSat, and Numericable.

In December 2016, SFR announced that it had signed an exclusivity agreement with NBCUniversal and resumed exclusive distribution of Syfy, 13ème Rue Universal and E!, available until now in the Canal offers as well as via the Freebox of Free.
 
Since then, the channels have arrived at SFR, but are still broadcast on Canal, Free and Orange. But this was no longer the case as of 26 September 2017.

See also
List of Syfy Universal (France) programs

References

External links
Syfy France

 
Syfy
Television stations in France
French-language television stations
Television channels and stations established in 2005
2005 establishments in France
Science fiction television channels
Universal Networks International